Crispin Hellion Glover (born April 20, 1964) is an American actor and filmmaker. He is known for portraying eccentric characters on screen, such as George McFly in Back to the Future (1985), Layne in River's Edge (1986), Andy Warhol in The Doors (1991), Bobby McBurney in What's Eating Gilbert Grape (1993), the Thin Man in Charlie's Angels (2000) and Charlie's Angels: Full Throttle (2003), Willard Stiles in Willard (2003), Grendel in Beowulf (2007), The Knave of Hearts in Alice in Wonderland (2010), Phil in Hot Tub Time Machine (2010), and Mr. World in the Starz television series American Gods (2017–2021).

In the late 1980s, Glover started his company, Volcanic Eruptions, which publishes his books such as Rat Catching (1988) and also serves as the production company for the films he has directed, What Is It? (2005) and It Is Fine! Everything Is Fine. (2007).

Early life
Glover is an only child, born in New York City. He moved to Los Angeles with his family at the age of five. He is the son of actor Bruce Glover and actress and dancer Marion Elizabeth Lillian Betty Krachey, who retired upon his birth. He was named after the Saint Crispin's Day speech from William Shakespeare's play Henry V, which his parents enjoyed. "Hellion", his real middle name, had earlier been used as a false middle name by his father, who did not like his own real Germanic middle name, Herbert.

Glover's father is of English, Czech, and Swedish descent, while his mother has Czech (area surrounding Milevsko) and German ancestry. As a child, Glover attended the Mirman School from first through ninth grades. He then attended both Venice High for 10th and 11th grades, and Beverly Hills High School for 12th grade; he graduated in 1982.

Career

Acting

Glover began acting professionally at the age of 13. He appeared in several sitcoms as a teenager, including Happy Days and Family Ties. His first film role was in My Tutor (1983), which subsequently led to roles in Teachers and Friday the 13th: The Final Chapter (both 1984). He then worked with director Trent Harris on the third chapter of the Beaver Trilogy, entitled The Orkly Kid. In this short film, he portrayed a small-town man who organizes a local talent show to showcase his obsession with Olivia Newton-John, much to the embarrassment of the local community. At the climax of the film, Glover does his rendition, in full drag, of Newton-John's "Please Don't Keep Me Waiting" from her 1979 album Totally Hot.

His breakout role was as George McFly in Robert Zemeckis's Back to the Future, an international box-office success in 1985; his character was the father of Marty McFly, despite being three years younger than Michael J. Fox in real life. Glover and the producers could not agree on suitable terms for him to appear in the sequels. 

He has continued to play exceedingly eccentric types, including playing Andy Warhol in Oliver Stone's The Doors in 1991, as well as the title characters in Bartleby (2001) and Willard (2003). He received mainstream attention as the Thin Man in the Charlie's Angels films; the character had initially been cast as a speaking role, but Glover, noting that the lines as written were exposition, convinced the producers to eliminate the lines to create a precise image for the character.

Glover was a co-interlocutor with Norm Hill and Werner Herzog for the special feature commentary for the DVD of Werner Herzog's Even Dwarfs Started Small and Fata Morgana.

Glover appeared in the 2007 film Beowulf as the monster Grendel, playing the part through performance capture technology. The film was Glover's first collaboration with director Robert Zemeckis since the original Back to the Future film. He voiced the character "6" in the film 9. Glover played Ilosovic Stayne/the Knave of Hearts in Tim Burton's Alice in Wonderland. He played the one-armed bellman in Hot Tub Time Machine, and the unwitting employee of Robert De Niro's character in The Bag Man.

Fake Shemp Lawsuit
In Back to the Future Part II, Zemeckis reused brief footage of Glover that had been filmed for the first film. Glover was billed as "George McFly in footage from Back to the Future" in the closing credits. The older footage was combined with new footage of actor Jeffrey Weissman wearing a false chin, nose and cheekbones, and various obfuscating methods – in the background, wearing sunglasses, rear shot, upside down – to play George McFly. Because these methods suggested that Glover himself had performed for the film, he successfully sued the producers on the grounds that they had used his likeness without permission, as well as not having paid him for the reuse of the footage from the original film. He was awarded a reported $760,000, and as a result of this suit,  clauses in the Screen Actors Guild collective bargaining agreements now state that producers and actors are not allowed to use such methods to reproduce the likeness of other actors, what is known as a Fake Shemp.

Music
In 1989, during a hiatus from films, Glover released an album titled The Big Problem Does Not Equal the Solution, The Solution Equals Let It Be through Restless Records, produced by Barnes & Barnes. The album features original songs such as "Clowny Clown Clown", odd versions of Lee Hazlewood's "These Boots Are Made for Walkin'", and Charles Manson's "I'll Never Say Never to Always" (sung in falsetto), and readings from his art books Rat Catching and Oak Mot. Sample pages from these books are featured in the album's liner notes.

Glover recorded a version of the Michael Jackson song "Ben" to coincide with the release of his 2003 film Willard; the song had been written for the sequel to the original 1971 version of the film. In the music video for the song, he sings to a rat named Ben.

Several songs using Glover's name as the title have been recorded by various artists, including shoegaze/gothic rock band Scarling., Chicago outsider musician Wesley Willis, and a New Jersey-based band called Children in Adult Jails.

Books
Glover, himself, reports to have written between 15 and 20 books. Oak-Mot and Rat Catching are featured prominently during his Big Slide Show presentation, and are presented as visual art as much as written art. He constructs the books by reusing old novels and other publications that have fallen into the public domain due to their age (for example, Rat Catching was constructed from an 1896 book Studies in the Art of Rat Catching, and Oak-Mot was constructed from an 1868 novel of the same title). He rearranges text, blacks out certain standing passages, and adds his own prose (and sometimes images) into the margins and elsewhere, thus creating an entirely new story. Five of his books have been published so far, through his publishing company, Volcanic Eruptions. Other known titles include The Backward Swing and A New World.

 Billow and the Rock (1983)
 Rat Catching (1988)
 Oak-Mot (1989)
 Concrete Inspection (1990)
 What it is, and How it is Done (1992)
 Round My House (2016)
* The publishing years listed above may not represent first-edition publication dates, but subsequent available editions.

Directing
Glover made his directorial debut with 2005's What Is It?, a surreal film featuring a cast of actors with Down syndrome. It premiered at the 2005 Sundance Film Festival. With a budget of only $150,000, it took almost a decade to complete, and was originally intended to be a short film. Most of the primary footage was shot in 12 days, stretched over a two-and-a-half-year period.

Glover's second film, It Is Fine! Everything Is Fine., was written by Utah writer and actor Steven C. Stewart. Stewart was born with severe cerebral palsy and had been confined to a nursing home for about 10 years. The film is a fantastical psychosexual retelling of life from Stewart's point of view.  Production was mostly funded by Glover's role Charlie's Angels and other films. It premiered at the 2007 Sundance Film Festival.

Glover has completed shooting his third feature film as a director, which he developed as a vehicle for his father Bruce Glover and himself to act together. This film is not part three of the It? trilogy.

Glover was recognized for his directorial work in 2013 when the Museum of Arts and Design in New York City staged the series It Is Crispin Hellion Glover. The program consisted of screenings of all of his directorial work, live performances, and speaking engagements.

He lists Luis Buñuel, Rainer Werner Fassbinder, Stanley Kubrick and Werner Herzog as influences on his film-making.

Personal life
Glover has residences in Los Angeles and the Czech Republic. His residence Zámek Konárovice, 45 minutes east of Prague by train, is a 17th-century  chateau that is recognized as historically significant by the Czech government. The property requires constant upkeep and restoration; according to Glover, "[The property] is a lifetime project that will be in continuous flux and repair for hundreds of years from now, as it has been the hundreds of years before I 'owned' it."

Glover is single, and has no children, citing his busy career as one of the reasons for which he feels unfit to be a father, as he feels that a father should be there for his children.<ref>{{cite news|url=https://www.theguardian.com/film/2015/jul/30/crispin-glover-the-carrier-interview|title=Crispin Glover: 'When you raise questions people say, 'You're crazy|newspaper=The Guardian|last=Freeman|first=Hadley|date=July 30, 2015|access-date=November 7, 2020}}</ref> From 2001 to 2003, Glover dated Alexa Lauren, a Penthouse magazine 'Pet of the Month' for September 1999.Erik Hedegaard (2003). "Crispin Glover: Not Of This World". August 21, 2003. Accessed July 17, 2017.

Late Night appearance
Glover appeared on Late Night with David Letterman on July 28, 1987, to promote River's Edge. To the surprise of Letterman and the audience, Glover appeared wearing platform shoes and a wig. During the interview, Glover behaved erratically and nearly kicked Letterman in the face, causing Letterman to walk off the set. Four years later, the film Rubin & Ed premiered, in which Glover has a starring role as titular character Rubin Farr. After the release of Rubin & Ed, some speculated that Glover was acting in-character as Rubin Farr during his appearance on Late Night''. Glover has refused to go into detail about the reasons for his behavior on the show, other than to mention that he was flattered that fans are still speculating on the performance decades later.

Filmography

Film

Television

Music video

References

External links

 
 
 
 TV.com bio and filmography

1964 births
Living people
21st-century American poets
American male film actors
American male screenwriters
American male singers
American male poets
American experimental filmmakers
American people of Czech descent
American people of English descent
American people of German descent
American people of Swedish descent
Beverly Hills High School alumni
Childfree
Film directors from California
Film producers from California
Film producers from New York (state)
Male actors from Los Angeles
Male actors from New York City
Male motion capture actors
Outsider artists
Outsider musicians
Restless Records artists
Screenwriters from California
Screenwriters from New York (state)
21st-century American screenwriters
Venice High School (Los Angeles) alumni
21st-century American male writers